United People's Party of Assam, was a political party in the Indian state of Assam. UPPA was an ally of Asom Gana Parishad and took part in an AGP-led government in the state. On 17 December 2000 UPPA merged with Samajwadi Party.

Defunct political parties in Assam
Political parties with year of establishment missing
Political parties disestablished in 2000
2000 disestablishments in India
Samajwadi Party